Felipe de Jesús Andres María Guadalupe de Iturbide y Huarte (November 30, 1822 — November 19, 1853)  was a nineteenth century Mexican royal. He was bestowed the title of Mexican Prince during the First Mexican Empire by the Constituent Congress.

Early life 
He was a son of Agustín de Iturbide and Ana María Huarte.

Decree 
The Sovereign Mexican Constituent Congress decreed on June 22, 1822 that:

Art 1 °. The Mexican Monarchy, is hereditary in addition to moderate and Constitutional.
Art 2 °. Consequently, the Nation calls the succession of the Crown for the death of the current Emperor, his firstborn son Don Agustín Jerónimo de Iturbide. The Constitution of the Empire decide the order of succession.
Art 3 °. The crown prince is called "Prince Imperial" and is treated as Imperial Highness.
Art 4 °. The legitimate sons and daughters of H.I.M will be called "Mexican Princes", and will be treated as Highness.
Art 5 °. Don José Joaquín de Iturbide y Arreguí, Father of H.I.M, was bestowed the title of "Prince of the Union" and treatment as Highness,.
Art 6 °. It granted the title "Princess of Iturbide" and treatment as Highness to Doña María Nicolasa de Iturbide y Arámburo, sister of the Emperor.

Treaty of Limits Between Mexico and the United States 
Felipe de Iturbide was an interpreter and translator of the Mexican Commission of Borders Matamoros Section of the peace treaty signed  on February 2, 1848, that was called Treaty of Peace, Friendship, Limits and Settlement between the United States of America and the Mexican Republic. This document specified the border between the two countries, which included the loss to Mexico of more than half of its territory, which would be added to the United States.

The Mexican Commission of Borders was integrated by:

First Stage

Second Stage

Ancestry

References 

House of Iturbide
Mexican nobility
1822 births
1853 deaths
Sons of emperors